Rajesh Raman Pillai (07 October 1974 – 27 February 2016) was an Indian film director best known for his work in the Malayalam cinema. He is credited with setting a new trend in Malayalam cinema with his thriller, Traffic (2011).

Rajesh Pillai made his directorial debut with Hridayathil Sookshikkan (2005) which turned out to be a commercial and critical failure. His second film Traffic, written by brothers Bobby and Sanjay was released in 2011. The film has its narrative in a hyperlink format and is inspired by an actual event that happened in Chennai. The film was a notable success and is widely regarded as one of the defining movies of the Malayalam New Wave.

In August 2012, the director announced his next movie titled Motorcycle Diaries. However Pillai put the project on hold and started the work of  Mili, a heroine-centric film with Amala Paul in title role opposite Nivin Pauly. The film released in January 2015 and received positive reviews from critics and became an above average grosser at box office.

Vettah, a psychological thriller starring Kunchacko Boban, Manju Warrier, Indrajith Sukumaran and Kadhal Sandhya, scripted by Arunlal Ramachandran, is touted to be the first ever mind game movie in Malayalam was released on 26 February 2016, a day before Pillai's death.  Manju Warrier plays the role of Sreebala IPS, the City Police Commissioner in this film.

Death 
Suffering from non-alcoholic fatty liver disease, Pillai died on 27 February 2016, at PVS Hospital, Kochi He is survived by his wife Megha, father Raman Pillai, and an elder sister.

Filmography

Awards and nominations 

 Won – 1st South Indian International Movie Awards for Best Direction – Traffic
 Won – Jaihind Film Awards 2012 for Best Direction – Traffic
 Won – Reporter TV Film Awards 2012 for Best Direction – Traffic
 Won – Nana Film Awards for Best Direction – Traffic
 Won – Amritha Film Award - Trend Setting Film Director
 Won – Aimfill Inspire Film Award - Best Innovative Film
 Won – National Film Promotion Council 2011 - Pratheeksha Puraskaram
 Won –Mathrubhumi  Film Awards 2011 - Path Breaking Movie of the Year
 Won – Minnalai Film TV Awards-Best Director - 2011
 Won –   Audi-Ritz Icon Award 2012 - Iconic Film of the Year Malayalam
 Won –  Santhosham South Indian Film Award 2011
 Won – Southspin Fashion Award-2012
 Nominated – Asianet Film Awards 2012 for Best Direction – Traffic
 Nominated – Surya Film Awards for Best Direction – Traffic

References

External links

Film directors from Kerala
2016 deaths
Malayalam film directors
1974 births
People from Alappuzha district
21st-century Indian film directors
Film producers from Kerala
Malayalam film producers